Gmina Dąbrowa may refer to either of the following rural administrative districts in Poland:
Gmina Dąbrowa, Kuyavian-Pomeranian Voivodeship
Gmina Dąbrowa, Opole Voivodeship